Åsnes og Våler is a former municipality in the old Hedmark county, Norway. The municipality existed from 1849 until 1854 when it was divided into the present-day municipalities of Åsnes and Våler. The administrative centre of the municipality was the village of Flisa, where Åsnes Church was located.

History
The municipality of Åsnes og Våler was established in 1849 when the municipality of Hof was divided (see formannskapsdistrikt law). Initially, Åsnes og Våler had a population of 7,087. In 1854, the municipality of Åsnes og Våler was divided to create two new municipalities: Åsnes with a population of 3,677 and Våler with a population of 3,410. Both municipalities still exist.

See also
List of former municipalities of Norway

References

Åsnes
Våler, Innlandet
Former municipalities of Norway
1849 establishments in Norway
1854 disestablishments in Norway